The 2014–15 San Diego State Aztecs women's basketball team represents San Diego State University in the 2014–15 college basketball season. The Aztecs, led by second year head coach Stacie Terry. The Aztecs played their home games at the Viejas Arena and were members of the Mountain West Conference. They finish the season 12–19, 8–10 in Mountain West play to finish in seventh place. They advance to the quarterfinals of the 2015 Mountain West Conference women's basketball tournament where they lost to New Mexico in the quarterfinals.

Roster

Schedule

|-
!colspan=9 style="background:#C23038; color:#231F20;"| Exhibition

|-
!colspan=9 style="background:#C23038; color:#231F20;"| Regular Season
|-
!colspan=9 style="background:#C23038; color:#231F20;"| Mountain West Women's Tournament

See also
2014–15 San Diego State Aztecs men's basketball team

References

San Diego State Aztecs women's basketball seasons
San Diego State